Joyce Hilda Hatto (5 September 1928 – 29 June 2006) was an English concert pianist and piano teacher. In 1956 she married William Barrington-Coupe, a record producer who was convicted of Purchase Tax evasion in 1966. Hatto became famous very late in life when unauthorised copies of commercial recordings made by other pianists were released under her name, earning her high praise from critics. The fraud did not come to light until 2007, more than six months after her death.

Early life and early career
Joyce Hatto was born in St John's Wood, London. Her father was an antique dealer and piano enthusiast. As a promising young professional, she played at a large number of concerts in London, and throughout Britain and Europe, beginning in the 1950s. There were concertos in which she was accompanied by the Boyd Neel, Haydn and London Symphony Orchestras, and many others; solo recitals at the Wigmore Hall, the Queen Elizabeth Hall and elsewhere; and concerts by "pupils of Joyce Hatto" in the late 1960s and early 1970s. She supplemented her earnings with work as a répétiteur for the London Philharmonic Choir under such conductors as Thomas Beecham and Victor de Sabata, and as a piano teacher, both privately and at schools including Crofton Grange, a girls' boarding school in Hertfordshire, where her pupils included the novelist Rose Tremain. She was also active in the recording studios for several companies such as Saga Records in England, as well as others in Hamburg and Paris.

Critical reception
Hatto's playing drew mixed notices from the critics. A critic for The Times wrote of a performance at Chelsea Town Hall in October 1953 that "Joyce Hatto grappled doggedly with too hasty tempi in Mozart's D minor piano concerto and was impeded from conveying significant feelings towards the work, especially in quick figuration." Trevor Harvey wrote of her Saga recording of Rachmaninoff's Piano Concerto No. 2 "one wonders ... whether her technique is really on top of the difficulties of this music ... She shows a musical sense of give and take with the orchestra but it remains a small, rather pallid performance" (The Gramophone, August 1961).

Vernon Handley, who conducted the Guildford Philharmonic on Hatto's 1970 recording of Sir Arnold Bax's Symphonic Variations for her husband's Revolution label, said; "[a]s a solo pianist, she was absolutely marvellous. She had ten wonderful fingers and she could get round anything and also she was an extraordinarily charming person to work with, even if she could be very difficult." In another interview, after the 2007 hoax perpetrated by her husband had been revealed, he added; "[s]he had a very doubtful sense of rhythm ... [t]he recording of the Bax was a tremendous labour." Still the record received a favourable review: "Joyce Hatto gives a highly commendable account of the demanding piano part," wrote Robert Layton (Gramophone, February 1971).

In 1973 Hatto gave the world premiere of two recently published Bourrées by Frédéric Chopin in London's Queen Elizabeth Hall. In 1976 she stopped performing in public and moved to Royston, Hertfordshire. It was later claimed that she already had cancer at the time. However, the consultant radiologist who saw her every six weeks for the last eight years of her life stated that she was first treated for ovarian cancer in 1992, fourteen years before her death, and had had no previous history of the disease.

Fraud
In Hatto's last years more than 100 recordings falsely attributed to her appeared. The repertoire represented on the CDs included the complete sonatas of Beethoven, Mozart and Prokofiev, concertos by Rachmaninoff, Tchaikovsky, Brahms and Mendelssohn and most of Chopin's compositions, along with rarer works such as the complete Godowsky Studies on Chopin's Études. The recordings were released, along with piano recordings falsely attributed to Sergio Fiorentino, by the Concert Artist Recordings label run by Hatto's husband William Barrington-Coupe, who had a long history in the record industry. The distinguished critic Neville Cardus had been dazzled by her playing, according to a story found in one obituary.

From 2003 onwards the recordings attributed to Hatto began to receive enthusiastic praise from a small number of participants on various Usenet groups, mailing lists and web forums, sparked by a blind-listening test in December 2002 posted on ThePiano Yahoo! group featuring a recording under Hatto's name of Liszt's Mephisto Waltz. Specialised record review magazines and websites such as Gramophone, MusicWeb and Classics Today, as well as newspapers such as The Boston Globe, eventually discovered Hatto, reviewed the recordings (with mostly very favourable notices) and published interviews and appreciations of her career; in one case, she was described as "the greatest living pianist that almost no one has ever heard of." Those praising the recordings included Tom Deacon, a former record producer for Philips, who produced that label's Great Pianists of the 20th Century series and was so fooled he praised and derided the same recording, thinking that one was by Hatto and the other by Matsuzawa; Bryce Morrison, a long-time reviewer for Gramophone; Jed Distler, a reviewer for Gramophone and Classics Today; Ateş Orga, a music critic who also wrote some of the liner notes for Concert Artist, as well as an obituary; and Ivan Davis, a well-known professional pianist.

In May 2005 the musicologist Marc-André Roberge reported on the Yahoo! Godowsky group that, in Hatto's version of the Chopin-Godowsky Studies on the Concert Artist label, a misreading of a chord was identical to one on the Carlo Grante recording (AIR-CD-9092, released 1993). However this coincidence did not prompt Roberge or others to investigate further at that time and verification of the copying from the Grante disc would only occur in 2007.

In early 2006 doubts about various aspects of Hatto's recording output were expressed, both in the rec.music.classical.recordings Usenet group and, following the publication of a lengthy appreciation of Hatto in the March issue of Gramophone, by readers of that magazine. In particular, some found it hard to believe that a pianist who had not performed in public for decades and was said to be fighting cancer should produce in her old age a large number of recordings, all apparently of high quality. It also proved difficult to confirm any of the details of the recordings made with orchestra, including even the existence of the conductor credited. The doubters were vigorously countered, most publicly by critic Jeremy Nicholas who in the July 2006 issue of Gramophone, challenged unnamed sceptics to substantiate their accusations by providing evidence that would "stand up in a court of law". Nicholas's challenge was not taken up and in December Radio New Zealand was able in all innocence, to re-broadcast its hour-long programme of glowing appreciation of the Concert Artist Hatto CDs. This programme included excerpts from a telephone interview with Hatto herself, conducted on 6 April 2006, in which she said nothing to dispel the presenter's assumption that she was the sole pianist on all the CDs.

The favourable reviews and publicity generated substantial sales for the Concert Artist CDs: in 2006, one online retailer did £50,000 worth of business with Barrington-Coupe. Barrington-Coupe himself claimed to have sold 3,051 Hatto CDs in 2005 and 2006, and 5,500 from 2007 up to February 2009, and that he had made a "thumping great loss" on them.

Death
Hatto died from ovarian cancer and deep vein thrombosis at her home in Royston, Hertfordshire, on 29 June 2006. She was cremated in Cambridge on 11 July 2006.

Revelation of fraud
In February 2007 it was announced in a series of articles in Gramophone and on the magazine's website, after the editor, James Inverne, had commissioned an intensive investigation by the audio expert Andrew Rose and others, that the CDs ascribed to Hatto had been discovered to contain copies, in some cases digitally manipulated (stretched or shrunk in time, re-equalised and rebalanced), of published commercial recordings made by other artists. While some of these artists were well-known, the majority were not. When Brian Ventura, a financial analyst from Mount Vernon, New York, put the recording of Liszt's Transcendental Études credited to Hatto into his computer the Gracenote database used by the iTunes software identified the disc, not as a recording by Hatto, but as one by László Simon. On checking online samples of the Simon recording Ventura found it to be remarkably similar to the version credited to Hatto. He then contacted Jed Distler, a critic for Classics Today and Gramophone, who had praised many of the recordings ascribed to Hatto.

Distler has said: 

An identification of the source of another recording, which had been in preparation for some months, was released the following day by the AHRC Research Centre for the History and Analysis of Recorded Music (CHARM, based at Royal Holloway, University of London) as a by-product of research on performances of Chopin Mazurkas. Within a week of the initial story being posted on the Gramophone website on 15 February, the sources for some 20 of Hatto's Concert Artist CDs had been identified.

On each of the concerto recordings published in Hatto's final years under her name the conductor's name was given as "René Köhler", and Barrington-Coupe provided a detailed biography for "Köhler". The information given there has not withstood careful scrutiny. The conductors whose work is represented on the concerto recordings credited to Hatto and Köhler are now known to include Esa-Pekka Salonen, André Previn and Bernard Haitink, while the orchestras, claimed to be the National Philharmonic-Symphony and the Warsaw Philharmonia, are now known to include the Vienna Philharmonic, the Philharmonia, and the Royal Philharmonic.

Admission of fraud
Barrington-Coupe initially denied any wrongdoing but subsequently admitted the fraud in a letter to Robert von Bahr, the head of the Swedish record label  BIS, which had originally issued some of the recordings plagiarised by Concert Artists. Bahr shared the contents of the letter with Gramophone, which reported the confession on its website on 26 February 2007. Barrington-Coupe claims that Hatto was unaware of the deception, that she would hear the final recordings believing that they were all her own work, that he acted out of love, that he made little money from the enterprise and that he started out by pasting portions of other pianists' recordings into recordings made by Hatto to cover up her gasps of pain. Some critics however have cast doubt on this version of events, not least James Inverne in Gramophone.

The discovery of plagiarised tracks on a Concert Artist CD released under the name of pianist Sergio Fiorentino raised further questions. Barrington-Coupe refused to help identify the sources of the recordings issued under Hatto's name, claiming that "whatever I do, it won't be enough".

Aftermath
The British Phonographic Industry (BPI) announced an investigation. According to a BPI spokesman in 2007, if the allegations were true, it would have been "one of the most extraordinary cases of piracy the record industry had ever seen".

Robert von Bahr of the BIS label said that he "had given a lot of thought" to suing Barrington-Coupe for damages but was inclined not to do so on the assumption that the hoax recordings were "a desperate attempt to build a shrine to a dying wife". He also said that he had advised László Simon to take advantage of the publicity by securing more concert engagements.

Barrington-Coupe himself said that he "had given up worrying" about possible legal consequences and added that "I don't consider I've hurt anybody. A lot of attention has been drawn to forgotten artists."

The Hertfordshire Constabulary said that it would not take any action unless a complaint was made by the copyright holder of one of the original recordings. This did not occur.

In 2009 Channel 4 in Britain broadcast a 20-minute documentary about the scam.

Barrington-Coupe died at his home in Royston on 19 October 2014.

TV film
A TV film,  Loving Miss Hatto, was filmed in Ireland and screened on BBC Television on 23 December 2012. The screenplay was by Victoria Wood and the film was made by Left Bank Pictures. Hatto was portrayed by Maimie McCoy and Francesca Annis. Rory Kinnear and Alfred Molina played her husband. Barrington-Coupe was still alive at the time, but Wood stated in an interview with The Guardian that she did not consult him when she was writing the screenplay, although members of the research team for the project had met with him on a number of occasions.

In literature
Hatto's story inspired a novel by the French-Vietnamese author Minh Tran Huy, La Double vie d'Anna Song ("The double life of Anna Song"). Anna Song, described as "the greatest pianist that no one has heard of", appears to record a huge discography despite illness and old age. Her husband, Paul Desroches, acts as producer for the recordings. It is later revealed in a magazine that the recordings are not the work of Song, but have been stolen by her husband from the work of others.

Another novel drawn from the Hatto case is Lynne Sharon Schwartz's Two-Part Inventions (2012). Schwartz has stated that her novel is directly based on the story of Hatto and Barrington-Coupe.

Recordings and their sources
The following is a list of some of the performances attributed to Hatto whose sources have so far been discovered (sorted by Concert Artist catalogue number). More detailed track by track information can be found at the Joyce Hatto Identifications website.

Early discography
The release of Arnold Bax's Symphonic Variations in E major (CACD90212 on the Concert Artist label) is a reissue of Hatto's 1970 recording with the Guildford Philharmonic conducted by Vernon Handley, originally issued on Barrington-Coupe's Revolution label.

Hatto's authentic recordings never had a wide distribution and the above-mentioned work of Bax was the last to appear on LP in 1970. In the 1980s, more works were released on cassette tapes (Grieg Piano Concerto and a number of Liszt compositions: the two Piano Concerti, Rigoletto paraphrase, Miserere del Trovatore paraphrase, Totentanz solo piano version, Seven Hungarian Historical Portraits). The solo piano repertoire of these releases shows works Hatto played also at that time in London on various occasions at the Wigmore Hall and other venues.

Her early releases include:
Concert Artist 7-inch EPs:
Walter Gaze Cooper Piano Concerto #3
Elspeth Rhys-Williams, 4 Impressions, 2 Songs
Michael Williams Introduction & Allegro for piano & orchestra
Saga:
"Music for the Films" (Addinsell, Bath, Chas. Williams) w/London Variety Theatre Orchestra/Gilbert Vinter
Gershwin Rhapsody in Blue w/Hamburg Pro Musica/George Byrd
Rachmaninoff Piano Concerto No. 2 w/Hamburg Pro Musica/George Hurst
Chopin Sonatas No. 1 & 3
Chopin Minor Piano works (Albumblatt, Fugue, Andante cantabile etc.)
Delta:
Mozart Piano Concertos K. 466 & 488 w/Pasdeloup Orchestra/Isaie Disenhaus
Mozart Piano Concerto K. 453, Rondo K. 382 w/London Classic Players/David Littaur
Fidelio:
Chopin 10 Nocturnes
Gershwin 16 items from the "Song Book"
Lecuona assorted piano pieces
Revolution:
Bax Piano Sonata #1, Piano Sonata #4, Toccata, Water Music
Bax Symphonic Variations in E w/Guildford Philharmonic/Vernon Handley
Boulevard
Rhapsody in Blue & An American in Paris from George Gershwin, with The New York Symphonica, conducted by George Byrd(Album brought out in 1973, by Allied Records Ltd., 326 Kensal Road, London, W10, as Boulevard, number 4124)

References

External links

 Andrys Basten's comprehensive listing of links to news items, interviews and commentaries; includes download of Mephisto Waltz recording cited in Jan. 2003 on RMCR newsgroup
 Joyce Hatto Identifications website
 Mark Lawson, "Our ears may deceive us", The Guardian, 2 March 2007.
 Geoff Edgers, "Cherished music wasn't hers", Boston Globe, 27 February 2007.
 Gramophone: "'I did it for my wife' – Joyce Hatto exclusive, William Barrington-Coupe confesses", published 26 February 2007 
 Telegraph: "The Hatto scandal is no human tragedy – but it might make a melodrama" – Julian Lloyd Webber, published: 5 April 2007 	
 International Herald Tribune: "The Joyce Hatto Scandal", Denis Dutton, published 25 February 2007. Republished in New York Times
 The Telegraph: " My wife's virtuoso recordings are genuine", published 20 February 2007
 David Patrick Stearns, "Ears don't deceive – the CD covers do". Philadelphia Inquirer, 20 February 2007.
 "Will the Real Joyce Hatto Please Stand Up", by David Hurwitz, published 18 February 2007
 Gramophone: "Masterpieces or Fakes? The Joyce Hatto Scandal", published 15 February 2007
 "Joyce Hatto – The Ultimate Recording Hoax" on PristineClassical.com, released 15 February 2007
 Times Online: "Piano ‘genius’ is branded a fake", published 17 February 2007
 New York Times: "A Pianist’s Recordings Draw Praise, but Were They All Hers?," published 17 February 2007
 Boston Globe "Joyce Hatto, at 77; pianist was prolific recording artist" published 4 July 2006, retrieved 10 July 2006
 Joyce Hatto – A Pianist of Extraordinary Personality and Promise
 Joyce Hatto, English pianist, dies aged 77 - Gramophone 5 July 2006
 iTunes fingers musical fraud
 Radio New Zealand feature including interview with Hatto, first broadcast 28 May 2006
 "'Hatto Recordings Counterfeit?', Radio New Zealand, 19 Feb 2007"
 Fantasia For Piano (New Yorker article including interview with William Barrington-Coupe), 17 September 2007
 "The Hatto scandal is no human tragedy - but it might make a melodrama", Daily Telegraph 12 April 2007
 Who Was Joyce Hatto? (BBC Radio 4 programme)

1928 births
2006 deaths
English classical pianists
English women pianists
Musical hoaxes
Deaths from ovarian cancer
Musicians from London
People from St John's Wood
20th-century classical pianists
20th-century classical musicians
20th-century English musicians
21st-century classical pianists
Deaths from cancer in England
People from Royston, Hertfordshire
English fraudsters
20th-century English women musicians
21st-century English women musicians
20th-century English businesspeople
20th-century women pianists
21st-century women pianists